Sterling Archibald Galt (October 1866 – October 21, 1908) was a United States Army Sergeant Major who received the Medal of Honor for actions on November 9, 1899, during the Philippine–American War. He later obtained the rank of Sergeant Major. Sergeant Major Galt was born in Taneytown, Maryland.

He is buried in Orient Cemetery Harrisonville, Missouri.

Medal of Honor citation
Rank and organization: Artificer, Company F, 36th Infantry, U.S. Volunteers.
Place and date: At Bamban, Luzon, Philippine Islands, November 9, 1899.
Entered service at: Pawneytown, Md.
Birth: Pawneytown, Md.
Date of issue: April 30, 1902.

Citation:
Distinguished bravery and conspicuous gallantry in action against insurgents.

See also

List of Medal of Honor recipients
List of Philippine–American War Medal of Honor recipients

References

 

1866 births
1908 deaths
People from Taneytown, Maryland
United States Army soldiers
American military personnel of the Philippine–American War
United States Army Medal of Honor recipients
Philippine–American War recipients of the Medal of Honor